Ghiffa (Ghifa in Lombard) is a comune (municipality) in the Province of Verbano-Cusio-Ossola in the Italian region Piedmont, located about  northeast of Turin and about  northeast of Verbania on the western shore of the Lake Maggiore.

It is most famous for the Sacro Monte, a site of pilgrimage and worship close to it, inserted by UNESCO in the World Heritage List.

Notable people
Peter Troubetzkoy lived in Ghiffa

References

External links

Official web site for European Sacred Mountains 

Cities and towns in Piedmont